Makinley Blows (born 12 December 1997) is an Australian cricketer who plays for Victoria in the Women's National Cricket League (WNCL). An all-rounder, she bats left-handed and bowls right-arm medium pace.

In the 2015–16 under-18 State Championships, Blows was able to produce a knock of 152 not out to help send her team, Mallee Murray into the finals.

Prior to that, in 2014–15, she made heads turn by scoring two unbeaten centuries on Day 2 of the under-18 State Female Championships. In the first match, she scored 125* after only facing 69 balls, while in the afternoon she dominated with 105* also off 69 balls.

Blows was also a major contributor with the bat in the under-18 National Championships, scoring 205 runs throughout the tournament. Not only did she make in impact with the bat, but Blows was able to do some damage with the ball, with her best figures including 2/20 against South Australia.

References

External links

Makinley Blows at Cricket Australia

1997 births
Living people
People from Broken Hill, New South Wales
Sportswomen from New South Wales
Cricketers from New South Wales
Australian women cricketers
Melbourne Renegades (WBBL) cricketers
Melbourne Stars (WBBL) cricketers
Victoria women cricketers